The 1995–96 Anglo-Italian Cup was the last Anglo-Italian Cup competition. The European football competition was played between eight clubs from England and eight clubs from Italy. Italian side Genoa lifted the trophy after beating English side Port Vale 5–2.

Format
For the competition there were eight English teams and eight Italian teams. These teams were split into two groups consisting of four English and four Italian teams each. Each team played against the four teams in their group from the opposing nation. In each group, the best team from each nation progressed to the regional semi-finals. The semi-finals were two-leg matches played between each nation's group winners. The winner of each  semi-final then met in a final.

Group stage

Group A games

Group A tables

English teams

Italian teams

Group B games

Group B tables

English teams

Italian teams

Regional Semi-finals
English semi-final

Italian semi-final

Regional Finals
English final

Italian final

Tournament Final

References

Anglo-Italian Cup
Anglo-Italian Cup 1996
Anglo-Italian Cup
Anglo-Italian Cup